YouTubers are people mostly known for their work on the video sharing website YouTube. The following is a list of Pakistani YouTubers for whom Wikipedia has articles either under their own name or their YouTube channel name. This list excludes people who, despite having a YouTube presence, are primarily known for their work elsewhere.

† Denotes the person is deceased

See also 

 List of YouTubers

References 

Pakistani YouTubers